Asterix the Gaul is the first volume of the Asterix comic strip series, by René Goscinny (stories) and Albert Uderzo (illustrations). In Le Monde 100 Books of the Century, a 1999 poll conducted by the French retailer Fnac and the Paris newspaper Le Monde, Asterix the Gaul was listed as the 23rd greatest book of the 20th century.

Plot summary
All of the Gaul area is under Roman control, except for one small village in Armorica (present-day Brittany), whose inhabitants are made invincible by a magic potion created periodically by the Druid Getafix. To discover the secret of the Gauls' strength, Centurion Crismus Bonus, commander of a Roman garrison at the fortified camp of Compendium, sends a spy disguised as a Gaul to the village. The Roman's identity is revealed when he loses his false moustache, shortly after he discovers the existence of the magic potion; whereupon he reports his discovery to the Centurion.

Crismus Bonus, hoping to overthrow Julius Caesar, orders Getafix captured and interrogated for the recipe; but to no avail. Protagonist Asterix learned of Getafix's capture from a cart-seller; infiltrates the Roman camp in the latter's cart; and hears Crismus Bonus revealing his intended rebellion to Marcus Ginandtonicus, his second-in-command. Following Asterix's suggestion, Getafix pretends to agree to the Centurion's demand of the potion when Asterix pretends to give in to torture, and demands an unseasonal ingredient: strawberries. While Crismus Bonus' soldiers try to find strawberries, Asterix and Getafix relax in relative luxury; and when the strawberries arrive, consume them all, and console Crismus Bonus that the potion may be made without them.

After all the ingredients are found, a potion is prepared that causes the hair and beard of the drinker to grow at an accelerated pace. The Romans are tricked into drinking this potion and before long, all of them have long hair and beards. When Crismus Bonus pleads Getafix to make an antidote, the druid makes a cauldron of vegetable soup (knowing that the hair-growth potion shall soon cease to take effect), and also prepares a small quantity of the real magic potion for Asterix. As Getafix and Asterix escape, they are stopped by a huge army of Roman reinforcements commanded by Julius Caesar. Upon meeting Asterix and Getafix, Caesar hears of Crismus Bonus' intentions against himself; deports Crismus Bonus and his garrison to Outer Mongolia; and frees Asterix and Getafix for giving him the information, while reminding them that they are still enemies. The two Gauls then return to their village, where their neighbors celebrate their return.

Characters

Introducing
 Asterix – Gaulish warrior
 Obelix – Gaulish menhir delivery man and warrior
 Getafix – Gaulish druid
 Vitalstatistix – Chief of the Gaulish Village
 Cacofonix – Gaulish bard
 Fulliautomatix – Gaulish blacksmith
 Julius Caesar – Roman leader (historical)

Development
Because this is the first album, many story points and characterisations are still in their formative stages. In fact, due to its original, serial nature, some develop and change even as the story progresses:
 The Roman second-in-command changes abruptly a few pages into the story.
 Getafix begins the story living in a cave in the forest and looking much like a stereotypical caveman. He also uses a walking stick.
 Obelix is seen carrying an axe in his first appearance. It is never seen again. He is satisfied with helping Asterix eat just one boar between them. Obelix is only a peripheral character in the first album, and doesn't truly become Asterix's sidekick until the next album. He is also seen carrying much larger amounts of rock than in later stories.
 Asterix and other villagers appear to be using the potion constantly, yet seeing the potion being made is viewed as an event.
 Fulliautomatix is seen working metal with his bare hands. He also bears no resemblance to his later appearances.
 Cacofonix the bard plays and calls a dance, and at the end is seated at the table at the feast. Later albums established a running gag where he is never allowed to sing (except in Asterix and the Normans, The Mansions of the Gods and Asterix and the Magic Carpet), and is tied up and gagged at feasts to prevent this.
 When he is first introduced in the prologue, Caesar has a completely different look than he has in the rest of the series, including at the end of this album.

Publishing history
The story was first published as a serial in Pilote magazine, a Franco-Belgian comics magazine founded by Goscinny and a few other comic artists.

The first page appeared in the promotional issue #0, distributed on 1 June 1959, and the story was serially published in the magazine from issue #1 (29 October 1959) until issue #38 (14 July 1960). A small head of Asterix first appeared on the cover of #9 (24 December 1959), and a full Asterix cover was used on #21 (17 March 1960).

The next story, Asterix and the Golden Sickle, started in issue #42 (11 August 1960).

Asterix le Gaulois was published in July 1961 by Dargaud in the so-called "Pilote collection" with a print of 6000 copies. A Dutch translation followed in 1966, and other languages followed soon after.

The English translation by Anthea Bell and Derek Hockridge was first published in 1969 by Brockhampton Press.

The plate for page 35 was redrawn by Albert Uderzo's brother Marcel in 1970 because the original was lost. This is why there are some slight differences in the drawing style. All English versions from Hodder & Stoughton (Hodder Dargaud) use the original illustrations, which were made from a copy of an actual printed page, hence the blurriness. The 2004 release from Orion Books uses the redone illustrations from the French editions.

An audiobook of Asterix the Gaul adapted by Anthea Bell and narrated by Willie Rushton was released on EMI Records Listen for Pleasure label in 1990.

On 29 October 2009, Google prominently featured an integration of Asterix and Obelix in its mast head, celebrating the 50th anniversary of the first publication.

The 2019 American Papercutz edition presents a few changes:
 Getafix is named Panoramix, the same name used in the original French edition. 
 The Roman Camps of Totorum and Compendium are renamed to Butterdrum and Lilchum, respectively.
 The original decurion's name is changed from Julius Pompus to Julius Pompilius. 
 It changes all references to the Circus Maximus to the Colosseum, even though in the timeline it wouldn't be built for another 120 years.

British comic adaption
Valiant comics saved #59 (16 November 1963) carried a British version of Asterix with just the names changed which ran for a time, on the back page (so it was in colour). It was called "Little Fred and Big Ed" and they lived in a British village called Nevergiveup, the druid was named Hokus Pokus and the chief Roman was called Pompus.

Film adaptation
The book was adapted into a film, which was released in 1967. Goscinny and Uderzo were not consulted during the making of the film, and the first they heard of it was a few months before it was released, when they were shown an early version of it. It was generally not well received, and a planned adaptation of Asterix and the Golden Sickle, made by the same animation team, was scrapped.

In other languages

Albanian: Gali Asteriks
Arabic: أستريكس بطل الأبطالل
Basque: Asterix Galiarra
Bengali: গলযোদ্ধা অ্যাস্টেরিক্স
Bulgarian: Астерикс – Галът
Catalan: Astèrix el Gal
Croatian: Asteriks Gal
Czech: Asterix z Galie
Danish: Asterix og hans gæve gallere
Dutch: Asterix de Galliër
Esperanto: Asteriks la Gaŭlo
Estonian: Gallialane Asterix
Finnish: Asterix gallialainen
French: Astérix le Gaulois
Frisian: Asterix de Galjer
Gaelic: Asterix an Ceilteach
Galician: Astérix o Galo
German: Asterix der Gallier
Greek: Αστερίξ ο Γαλάτης
Hebrew: אסטריקס הגאלי
Hindi: एस्ट्रिक द गाल
Hungarian: Asterix, a Gall
Icelandic: Ástríkur Gallvaski
Indonesian: Asterix Prajurit Galia
Italian: Asterix il Gallico
Irish: Asterix na nGallach
Latin: Asterix Gallus
Mirandese: Asterix, L Goulés
Norwegian: Asterix og hans tapre gallere
Polish: Przygody Gala Asteriksa
Portuguese: Astérix o Gaulês
Romanian: Asterix, eroul galilor
Russian: Астерикс из Галлии
Serbian: Астерикс, Галски јунак/Asteriks, galski junak 
Sinhalese: සූර පප්පා
Slovak: Gal Asterix
Slovenian: Asterix, galski junak
Spanish: Asterix el Galo
Swedish: Asterix och hans tappra galler
Turkish: Galyalı Asteriks
Welsh: Asterix y Galiad

See also 
Le Monde 100 Books of the Century

References

Gaul, Asterix the
Works originally published in Pilote
Literature first published in serial form
1961 graphic novels
Works by René Goscinny
Comics by Albert Uderzo
Depictions of Julius Caesar in comics
Cultural depictions of Vercingetorix